Outgrown Things is the debut extended play by Movements. The album reached 42 on the Indie charts.

Background
After forming in January 2015, Movements self-released their first single, "Protection" on January 31, 2015. The band played their first show opening for Have Mercy in March 2015. A second single, "Buried" was released on March 17. A third single, "Scripted" was released on April 14. After only one local gig, the band signed a three-record deal with Fearless Records in August 2015.

Before recording their first EP, guitarist Brett Chiodo left the band in January 2016. Chiodo wrote the EP with the band, but did not participate in the recording. He was replaced by guitarist Ira George.

The band chose producer Will Yip to work on their debut EP. Outgrown Things was released on March 11, 2016. The EP was preceded by two singles, "Kept" and "Nineteen".

Reception

Outgrown Things received positive reviews. AltPress called it one of the 12 best EPs of 2016.

Track listing

Personnel
Patrick Miranda - Lead vocals
Ira George - lead guitar
Austin Cressey - bass guitar and rhythm guitar
Spencer York - drums, percussion

Charts

References

External links

Outgrown Things at YouTube (streamed copy where licensed)

2016 albums
Movements (band) albums
Fearless Records EPs
Albums produced by Will Yip